Sexual Ecology: AIDS and the Destiny of Gay Men is a 1997 book by the gay activist Gabriel Rotello, in which the author discusses why HIV has continued to infect large numbers of gay men despite the widespread use of condoms, and why many experts believe that new HIV infections will disproportionately strike gay men in the future. To investigate, he examines the origins and history of the AIDS epidemic, and draws upon epidemiology, sociology, gay history, and ecology. His conclusion is that gay men need to reduce the number of partners and increase the use of condoms in order to bring the infection rate down.

Rotello's central argument derives from the epidemiological concept that sexually transmitted epidemics are the result of three factors, sometimes called the Triad of Risk: 1. the ‘infectivity’ of a sexually transmitted disease (STD), or how easily it spreads, 2. the ‘prevalence’ of that STD in a particular group, and 3. the ‘contact rate,’ or the average number of sexual partners that people have within a particular group.

Rotello argues that gay men significantly lowered the first leg of the triad, infectivity, through the use of condoms, yet condoms alone proved unable to quell the epidemic because the second leg of the triad, prevalence, was already so high. Therefore, gay men needed to address the third leg of the triad, the contact rate. Rotello argues that lowering the contact rate while continuing to emphasize condoms might provide enough additional ‘room for error’ to bring new infections below the epidemic's tipping point.

Sexual Ecology was considered by some a major contribution to the AIDS discourse and became a gay best seller. New Scientist called it, “...a remarkable book...a breath of fresh air in the growing litany about the AIDS epidemic.” The New York Times called it ‘trenchant’ and ‘brave’ and said it “merits the attention of a broad audience,” while The Boston Globe described it as “...the Silent Spring of the AIDS epidemic.” It also received considerable praise by some within the LGBT community. Writing in The Nation, gay historian Martin Duberman called it, “...the most important book about gay men and AIDS since And the Band Played On. And it is far better.”

But Sexual Ecology was criticized by others within the gay community for arguing that multiple partners played a significant role in the etiology and longevity of the gay AIDS epidemic and that, along with condoms, partner reduction was key to containing the epidemic. Mark Schoofs in the Village Voice called Sexual Ecology "toxic" and "an ugly distortion of gay life." AIDS activist Jim Eigo compared Rotello to right wingers like Pat Buchanan and Jesse Helms, writing that he “scapegoats and stigmatizes those of us who engage in multipartnerism.” A new activist organization, Sex Panic!, was formed in part to combat the message of Sexual Ecology, accusing Rotello and other writers whom the group labeled ‘gay neo-cons,’ particularly Michelangelo Signorile, Larry Kramer and Andrew Sullivan, of betraying gay sexual freedom.

Background 
In the 1980s Gabriel Rotello was a New York City AIDS activist and member of the group ACT UP. In 1989 he founded OutWeek Magazine and became its editor-in-chief. The New York Times called the magazine “the most progressive of the gay publications,” saying that it “gave voice to a new generation of AIDS activists ....and provided a rallying point for the more militant members of the gay community.” Rotello was controversial for promoting the word ‘queer’ as a catchall phrase for sexual minorities and for the phenomenon of ‘outing,’ which began at OutWeek. As such, he considered himself a member of the gay left. In 1992 he became the first openly gay man to become an op-ed columnist for a major American newspaper, New York Newsday, and used that platform to argue for gay rights and AIDS activism.

During Rotello's tenure at New York Newsday, AIDS epidemiologists began reporting about a ‘second wave’ of HIV infections among gay men. Some studies indicated that 40% or more of young gay men would become infected with HIV by the time they reached middle age, despite the wide promotion of condoms. Many activists, including Rotello, had previously argued that the problem of new HIV infections had been largely solved by the promotion of condoms in the 1980s.

Rotello began investigating the underlying reasons why AIDS had happened to gay men originally and why it was continuing. One result was a cover story for Out Magazine titled “The Birth of AIDS,” which described the emerging scientific consensus that HIV had existed in human populations for decades before the 1980s but had not previously produced an epidemic because it required a unique set of circumstance to spread. That article was eventually expanded into Sexual Ecology.

As he began writing Sexual Ecology new gay sex clubs opened in New York City that allowed unprotected anal sex in open settings for the first time in over a decade. Rotello wrote columns criticizing this in New York Newsday and joined a group called Gay and Lesbian HIV Prevention Activists (GALHPA) that argued that such venues should enforce safe sex or be closed. GALHPA's stance caused considerable controversy and reignited the “bath house debates” of the early 80s. It was against this backdrop that Sexual Ecology was published by Dutton in 1997.

Subject 
In Sexual Ecology’s Introduction, Rotello argues that gay men have fundamentally misunderstood why AIDS happened to them, and that this misunderstanding negatively impacts their ability to contain the epidemic. He presents a number of what he calls ‘myths’ about the AIDS epidemic which the book will challenge, including that, “The epidemic occurred primarily because HIV is a new disease in humans,” that “it was essentially an accident that the epidemic struck gay men,” and that “multiple partners don’t matter because gay men’s promotion of condoms created a workable version of safe sex that allows people to continue to have multiple partners safely.”

He then presents a “primer on ecology” that describes how all diseases have environmental and behavioral as well as biological aspects, including sexually transmitted diseases (STDs).

Chapter 1 

Chapter 1 of Sexual Ecology presents evidence that HIV existed in human populations for at least several decades, before the AIDS epidemic first appeared in Africa, Haiti, and among American gay men in the 1980s. According to this theory, which has since been bolstered by additional evidence, HIV did not previously cause epidemics because it is very difficult to transmit and because the kinds of collective behaviors needed to ‘amplify’ it into an epidemic did not exist on a sufficient scale before the sexual and IV drug revolutions of the sixties and seventies.

Chapter 2 

In Chapter 2 Rotello turns to the question of why AIDS happened to American gay men when it did. Drawing on historical sources, he presents evidence that prior to World War II most American gay men did not engage in high risk behavior likely to lead to epidemics: they had fewer partners, they were more inclined to have oral rather than anal sex, and they were more likely to engage in sex with so-called “trade,’ or non-homosexually identified men. He cites evidence that gay men of that era actually had fewer STDs than the surrounding heterosexual population.

To explain how changes in this behavior ultimately led to multiple epidemics of STDs among gay men in the 70s, he describes the dynamics of STD epidemics. One key is the epidemiological concept of the ‘tipping point,” the point when the average infected person infects, on average, more than one other person and the disease begins to spread. Rotello describes the three factors that govern this process, the so-called Triad of Risk: the interaction of Prevalence, Infectivity, and Contact Rate.

Prevalence describes the percentage of people in a pool of potential sex partners who are already infected. For example, if prevalence is 1% (1 infected person out of 100 potential partners), risk is far lower than if prevalence is 50% (half of all potential partners are infected).

Infectivity describes the likelihood that the disease will be transmitted during a single sexual encounter. Different STDs have different levels of infectivity. Gonorrhea is estimated to have a 47% chance of transmission in a single encounter, while HIV is estimated at having a very low infectivity of about 1%. This implies that it is considerably more difficult to spark an epidemic of HIV than it is for other STDs, and that it requires extraordinary circumstances to do so.

Contact Rate, or partner change, describes the average number of sexual partners that people have within a given population or ‘sexual ecosystem,’ such as students at a particular college, or gay men in a particular city. “Simply put, without partner change no STD can spread. Partner A may infect partner B, but things will end there. In a thoroughly monogamous population, there would be no STDs at all, no matter how infectious certain microbes might theoretically be. Conversely, the higher the level of partner change, the more likely that even microbes that are relatively hard to transmit will have an opportunity to spread.”Rotello introduces an additional factor in STD epidemiology, the role of ‘core groups.’ He describes these as smaller groups within a larger sexual ecosystem that transmit STDs at significantly higher levels than the surrounding population. This can happen when core members have very large numbers of sexual partners who also have very large numbers of partners, creating a biological feedback loop that can ‘amplify’ diseases that enter the core. If people within the core also have partners outside the core, epidemics can get a foothold within the core and then “bridge” out to larger and larger circles of people.

Rotello describes how these factors began to work together in a dynamic way among gay men in the 1960s and 1970s as the previous restrictions on gay life gave way to the era of gay liberation and a culture of casual sex with multiple partners. He describes how similar changes were occurring among young heterosexuals during the same era but were vastly overshadowed by the gay world's network of bars, cruising areas, sex clubs and bathhouses. Within certain gay core groups, particularly those attending gay bathhouses and sex clubs, many gay men had hundreds of sexual partners per year, setting up a unique sexual ecology.

Chapter 3 

Chapter 3 describes how these conditions led to a cascading series of sexually transmitted epidemics among urban gay men in the 1970s. These included major epidemics of syphilis, gonorrhea, herpes, giardia and other intestinal parasites, Hepatitis A and B, Epstein-Barr virus, chlamydia, cytomegalovirus, and several other diseases.

“From rare viruses such as HTLV, to more common infections such as hepatitis A, every sexually transmitted infection that entered the gay male ecosystem rose to unprecedented levels, so that by the end of the decade homosexual men had by far the highest sexually transmitted disease load of any social group in America. In many instances it was dozens or even, as with intestinal parasites, hundreds of times higher than average.” 

Rotello then describes how HIV entered this system and began to spread. He cites data from a large study of Hepatitis B transmission among gay men that was enrolled in 1978, testing thousands of gay men in several American cities at 6-month intervals, a study which included collecting and freezing their blood samples for later study. The samples, “...were to become invaluable measures of the rise of HIV infection once a test for HIV antibodies became available in the mid-eighties. Researchers were then able to go back, retest the blood, and obtain a stop-motion picture of HIV’s deadly incursion into the gay male population.” The results indicate that when the study began in 1978 the percentage of gay men infected with HIV was in the low single digits. By 1985 it had risen to between 40% and 60% in most test cities, with peaks of 58% in Denver and Seattle, 60% in San Diego, 70% in Philadelphia, and 73% in the San Francisco cohort.

Rotello argues that in the context of the previous epidemics of syphilis, gonorrhea and other pathogens that had swept urban gay populations in the 70s, HIV took longer to get started and longer to spread because of its lower infectivity. But otherwise, there was nothing unusual in the way it spread. The main thing different about HIV was its generally fatal outcome.

He describes other aspects of gay sexual ecology that epidemiologists have cited for this rapid spread of HIV in addition to high levels of partners and highly active core groups. Among them are insertive/receptive ‘versatility, the practice of ‘concurrency,’ or having multiple partners concurrently as opposed to one at a time as in serial multipartnerism, the impact of viral load, the synergistic impact of multiple re-infections with various STDs which can lower immunity, the impact of substance abuse which can also lower immunity, and the ability of travel to move infections rapidly around the country. He also cites the theory of evolutionary biologist Paul W. Ewald that high levels of HIV transmission among gay men led to the evolution of more virulent strains.

Chapter 4 

In Chapter 4 Rotello describes the emergence of AIDS prevention and the ‘condom code’ in the mid-1980s. He discusses several possible alternative strategies that were debated early in the epidemic, such as urging gay men to temporarily stop having sex, to stop having anal sex, to lower partners, to become monogamous, or for gay organizations to simply give gay men the facts and let them decide how to respond. But he describes how condoms became the primary response to AIDS prevention in the gay world, dating from the publication of the influential pamphlet “How to Have Sex in an Epidemic” by Michael Callen and Richard Berkowitz. He describes this as having a sound theoretical basis in the triad of risk, the purpose of condoms being to lower the “infectivity” of each sex act to such a negligible level that both individuals and the larger community will be protected.

As someone who enthusiastically promoted condoms for many years, Rotello argues that another reason the ‘condom code’ became so popular was that it satisfied what he describes as the ‘dual imperative’ of gay AIDS prevention: to prevent new infections but to do so in a way that allows the gay sexual revolution to continue during an epidemic of a fatal disease. He cites How to Have Sex in An Epidemic which explicitly states, “The key is modifying what you do, not how often you do it, nor with how many different partners.”  In Rotello's view, many gay men did not want to face the possibility that a culture of casual sex might have to change in the face of AIDS. Finally, he describes how, as new infections plummeted in the later 1980s, the condom code appeared to be successful at the population level.

Chapters 5 and 6 

Chapters 5 and 6 describes the “second wave” of the AIDS epidemic among gay men in the 90s. Evidence showed that gay men were using condoms at historically high levels, in some studies up to 60% of the time. But epidemiological studies and mathematical models of the epidemic began to indicate that that was not high enough to bring the epidemic below the tipping point, primarily because prevalence was already so high that any failures to use condoms had a high chance of leading to a new infection. Rotello also presents evidence that while condoms are highly effective for individuals, the dramatic collective drop in new infections in the late 1980s had been due less to condoms than to the phenomenon of ‘saturation,” in which once 50-60% of gay men were infected, new infections had to decline until a new cohort of young uninfected men became sexually active.

Rotello describes how, as prevention activists began debating what to do, their focus was almost entirely on condoms and how to raise so-called 'condom compliance' even higher. Among the primary reasons that condom use was not higher than 50% or 60%, prevention activists cited lack of safer sex education, lack of condom availability, the oppression of the closet and substance abuse. Many pointed to psychological reasons, from sexual passion, love and emotional needs to grief and depression, to partner coercion. Some experts cited gay ‘folk beliefs’ that HIV could not be transmitted in certain circumstances.

Rotello accepts all these reasons but argues that attempts to discover why gay men do not have higher condom compliance asks the wrong question. He points out that in fact gay men were far more successful promoting condoms than most behavior-change efforts in society at large.

“Dieters slip off their diets. Alcoholics fall off the wagon. Former smokers impulsively light up. Responsible drivers sometimes drive drunk, or fail to buckle up. Couples desperate not to have a child sometimes fail to use birth control. Failure at compliance is not a specifically “gay” problem, and although failure to be perfect can be exacerbated by contributing factors like lack of education, substance abuse, self-hatred, or survivor’s guilt, such failure is not in its deepest sense caused by those factors, at least not for most people. It seems part of many of our natures to be occasionally impulsive creatures who do not always act in our own genuine long-term best interests. In fact, from the perspective of behavior change, the amazing thing about gay men’s rate of condom use is not that it is so low, but that it is so high. Compared to campaigns that attempt to encourage people to quit smoking, or to diet and exercise, or to quit using addictive drugs, campaigns that often measure success in single percentage points, the consistent adoption of condoms by approximately half of all gay men is a remarkable success by almost any behavioral scale.”

For Rotello the issue is that in a population as highly saturated with HIV as American gay men, even remarkably high condom use is not enough. Therefore, while gay men must continue using condoms, they need to add something else to the mix.

Chapter 7 

In chapter 7 Rotello detours away from gay men to discuss why AIDS did not create a self-sustaining epidemic among heterosexuals in the developed world, but did create such epidemics in places such as sub-Saharan Africa, Haiti and Thailand. He points to numerous studies showing that AIDS struck heterosexuals wherever patterns of heterosexual behavior were similar to gay male behavior in the United States, including very high contact rates and active core groups. “...the global epidemic clearly demonstrates that AIDS is not a “gay disease.” Homophobic theories that AIDS proves the inherent “unnaturalness” of homosexuality are belied by global statistics showing that 90 percent of all cases worldwide are spread via heterosexual sex. However, those same statistics illustrate that while AIDS is not a gay disease, it is certainly an ecological disease that will strike with fury at any population whose collective sexual behavior is characterized by high contact rates, active core groups, high levels of sexual mixing, and high carriage of other STDs.”

Conclusion 

Having presented his analysis of the history of the AIDS epidemic among gay men and why new infections are still so high, Rotello spends the final three chapters presenting his conclusions. He argues that while condoms are the single most important element of HIV prevention, a sole reliance on condoms has obscured the need to fundamentally address the other issues that perpetuate the AIDS epidemic among gay men, primarily high levels of multiple partners and active core groups. He calls the main reliance on condoms a classic “technological fix’ that seeks to avoid transformative change.

Instead, he argues that gay men need to craft a ‘holistic’ prevention that emphasizes condoms but also urges partner reduction and discourages core group behavior. In that way, the occasional failure to use condoms will occur against a more forgiving backdrop that provides room for error.

He argues that this is a long-term cultural project in which gay men need to craft both incentives for greater monogamy and disincentives for multipartnerism. He questions the assumption that promiscuity is or ought to be a central aspect of gay liberation and attacks the idea that liberated gay men will always default to multipartnerism, citing historical examples. Writing at a time before gay marriage was legal anywhere, he argues that the legalization of gay marriage might provide such an incentive for partner reduction. But he argues that overall, gay men will never see a reason to reduce partners and craft a holistic prevention strategy if they fail to realize the true causes of the epidemic and the true reasons for its longevity. And he warns that the epidemic will likely continue at a significant level until these changes.

Reception and controversy

Mainstream reception 

In a starred review, Kirkus Reviews called Sexual Ecology, “A compelling warning about gay culture and the imperative need for a change in beliefs and behavior. Rotello's message has been carefully and convincingly laid out. Well aware that his call for increased sexual restraint will be seen as reactionary and homophobic by those who cling to an orgiastic view of gay liberation, he anticipates their arguments and answers them persuasively in this impressive analysis of a pressing social problem.”

In another starred review, Publishers Weekly said that Rotello's “brave, significant book deserves to be as widely read as Randy Shilts’s And The Band Played On.”

Salon called Sexual Ecology, “...a bombshell...a transformative plan for sustaining gay culture and dealing with AIDS...Ideally, Sexual Ecology will lead to more honest, rational discussion about AIDS transmission, without feeding the hellfire flames favored by anti-gay outsiders. Ideally, it will generate practical, beneficial action.”

The Boston Globe wrote that Rotello, “...cogently rethinks the epidemic as the ecologically enabled result of HIV's biology and post-Stonewall gay sex...He seeks ‘a sustainable gay culture, one that does not destroy the very souls it liberates’ with a sexual ecology that must constantly add unnatural appliances, ranging from condoms to pills to who knows what else, to keep its members alive.”

The Sun Sentinel called it a “scrupulously researched and carefully constructed argument for a gigantic shift in how we view sexually transmitted diseases...This book marks a turning point, as perhaps the first major work to challenge how the dogma of gay liberation and AIDS education have sometimes blended into a potentially unhealthy cocktail of misinformation.”

Scientific reception 

Sexual Ecology received significant support within the scientific and public health communities.

New Scientist called it “remarkable” and “...a breath of fresh air in the growing litany about the AIDS epidemic.” Dr. Thomas Coates, the former director of the Center for AIDS Prevention Studies at UCSF, wrote, “As Gabriel Rotello argued in his book Sexual Ecology, an urban gay culture built around gay men each having unprotected sex with hundreds or thousands of different partners is simply not sustainable. It is not only the epidemics we all know about; other epidemics are waiting to happen.”

In his book The Tipping Point, author Malcolm Gladwell called Rotello's description of STD epidemiology in Sexual Ecology, “...one of the best lay treatments of the mechanics of a disease epidemic.”

Within a few years Sexual Ecology entered the syllabi of many medical schools and is widely read in schools of public health in the United States and elsewhere.

Gay press reception 

Among gay and AIDS activists and reviewers it also found significant support. ACT UP founder Larry Kramer called Sexual Ecology, “one of the most important books ever written for and about gay men.” Dr. Charles Silverstein, co-author of The Joy of Gay Sex, called it “the most important gay book of the 90s.” Co-founder of the Gay Men’s Health Crisis, Dr. Lawrence D. Mass, called it “The most important book in the history of the gay community and AIDS.”

Writing in POZ Magazine, pioneering AIDS activist and GMHC co-founder Roger McFarlane wrote:“Sexual Ecology blows the lid off the epidemiological closet....Whatever the complexity of the task, the first step must be an honest assessment of how we got into this mess and what each of us can do to end it. Rotello delivers that in spades. I dreaded reading Sexual Ecology because I didn’t want to be scolded about my sex life. What I discovered was one of the seminal works of the plague years. It belongs on the shelf next to And the Band Played On and Reports from the Holocaust. This is no sermon on unbridled libido. It’s a monumental testament of love for which we should thank the author.”

Criticism 

But others gay writers disagreed. In Out Magazine, Richard Goldstein wrote that Sexual Ecology “urges gay men to devise alternatives to promiscuity while haranguing them for failing to be restrained. It preaches communal solidarity while demonizing those who dissent. It offers a message of empathy laced with contempt.”

In a widely read rebuttal to Sexual Ecology, AIDS activist Jim Eigo wrote that the book's "central argument" is that gay men should "...abandon current safer sex strategies (primary among them the condom code) and adopt serial monogamy as a communal norm." Comparing Rotello to right wingers such as Jesse Helms and Pat Buchanan, Eigo called the concept of holistic prevention "a quirky regurgitation of Judeo-Christian doctrine" and "breathtakingly simpleminded...Reading it all I kept wondering, in what way would a crabbed monogamy be more holistic than a loving, healthy promiscuity?"

In The Village Voice, Mark Schoofs wrote that, “...Rotello presents an ugly distortion of gay history and life.” Schoofs disputed Rotello's underlying contention that HIV prevention was failing, writing: “Fortunately, prevention programs are working. As the Centers for Disease Controls Scott Holmberg recently told me, ‘There have been huge, marked behavior changes in every index of gay male behavior: entering monogamous relationships, reducing partners, using condoms.’”

Schoofs criticized Rotello’s contention that legalizing gay marriage might help to lower the contact rate: “Maybe, but legalizing gay marriage won't halt the homophobia that deforms gay kids.... Just below the book's surface runs the idea that if we remade gay culture in a straight image we would conquer HIV. However, the first principle of behavior change is not to impose outside norms but to build on indigenous ones.” He continued: “Rotello's browbeating rhetoric, his revision of AIDS-prevention history, and his distortion of gay life add up to more than "mere" matters of style, or politics, or even truth....Sexual Ecology could have helped lift gay men to a new understanding of how our lives interconnect. But Rotello has polluted his own grand metaphor and made it toxic. Ecology reads all too much like another indictment of gay men: We have done almost nothing right. This does not stand up to the historical record, nor will it stand up to the life experiences of most gay readers.”

Sex Panic! 

Several weeks after the release of Sexual Ecology, a new activist group called Sex Panic! was formed in New York City, in part to combat the book's agenda. In an interview in LinguaFranca founding members Gregg Gonsalves, an AIDS activist, and Michael Warner, an English professor, described how Sex Panic! arose during a meeting of a support group for HIV-positive men."We had our support group," Gonsalves says, "and at the end, it moved to talking about Gabriel Rotello's new book, and we all got sort of exercised about it.” "We were just sitting around and talking about how depressing it was that we kept hearing these stories about bars being closed," says Warner. "And then we kept turning to the gay press, and instead of seeing coverage about this or resistance to it, we would see these reactionary screeds by Rotello and [gay writer Michelangelo] Signorile."  Says Gonsalves, "And we thought, why don't we do something about this?" Gonsalves recruited among grassroots activists, and Warner, along with art critic Douglas Crimp recruited scholars. About fifty people showed up at the first Sex Panic organizational meeting in late May.” Sex Panic!’s name was derived from the work of late gay historian Allan Bérubé, who described historical ‘sex panics’ as “moral crusades that lead to crackdowns on sexual outsiders.” The contention was that Sexual Ecology and other works by gay writers such as Michelangelo Signorile, Larry Kramer and Andrew Sullivan were encouraging a governmental backlash against gay sexual freedom and contributing to a crackdown on New York City gay bars and sexual venues.

LinguaFranca describes a New York teach-in held by Sex Panic! in 1997:“... the crowd rewards anyone who mentions Rotello, Signorile, Kramer, or Sullivan with hisses, boos, and laughs. The men and women here tonight feel sure of their enemies, and as the evening advances, these enemies condense into one creature, a hyphenated neoconservative bogeyman named Rotello-Signorile-Kramer-Sullivan.”Benjamin Shepard in Queer Political Performance and Protest writes that Rotello, along with Signorile, Kramer and Sullivan, came to be known as, “...the Gang of Four of the late 90s panic within the GLBT community...they narrated gay life from an apologist perspective, describing AIDS as a punishment for queer sexuality and asking good gays to divorce themselves from their alter ego, ‘the promiscuous queer.’....The new sex wars were upon us.”Sex Panic! initiated a campaign of articles, posters, workshops and teach-ins to advance its views, which included discrediting Sexual Ecology as homophobic, assimilationist and scientifically inaccurate. Referring to Rotello and others, one flyer for a New York teach-in was headlined "DANGER! ASSAULT! TURDZ!". Sex Panic! held a national summit in San Diego in November 1997, much of which centered on combating and discrediting Sexual Ecology. Sex Panic! remained active for two years, defending public sex and criticizing developments such as the gentrification of New York's Times Square.

Sex Panic!’s critical stance on Sexual Ecology received widespread attention in the media. The New York Times reported “The volleying has deeply divided the gay intelligentsia. For the first time since the publication in 1987 of ''And The Band Played On'' by Randy Shilts, there is open debate among homosexuals about promiscuity's role in AIDS.” The article cited Michael Warner as arguing that, “....promiscuous sex is the essence of gay liberation, and that any attempt to fight AIDS by changing the culture is doomed. ‘It is an absurd fantasy to expect gay men to live without a sexual culture when we have almost nothing else that brings us together,' Mr. Warner said.”

Gabriel Rotello responded to Sex Panic!’s critique of Sexual Ecology with an “Open Letter to Sex Panic!”, which was widely reprinted in the gay press.

Legacy 

In Sexual Ecology, Rotello made a number of warnings and predictions, many of which have proved prescient and some not. He predicted that as new drugs effectively treated HIV, fear would abate and condom use would likely diminish, which has occurred.  He predicted that treatment could become a form of prevention by lowering group infectivity, which has also occurred. But he warned that if gay men responded to the availability of treatment by increasing unsafe sex and increasing multipartnerism - the phenomenon of so-called 'risk compensation' - then “the decline in infectivity could easily be outbalanced by a rise in the unsafe contact rate” leading to a continuing epidemic. This has also occurred.

He warned that without lowering the contact rate gay men would produce and maintain the highest incidence and prevalence of STD infections in the US, which has occurred. He worried that such patterns of behavior would prompt the emergence of novel STD pathogens and drug resistant forms of established STD pathogens. This has also occurred.

However, Rotello also predicted that as HIV continued to spread among gay men, it might mutate into increasingly virulent or drug-resistant strains. Studies indicate that this is occurring but has not so far reached levels that would alter the trajectory of the epidemic. And he predicted that as gay men continued to transmit HIV despite knowledge of how not to, mainstream society might withdraw some support for gay rights. In fact, polls show that public belief that AIDS is the nation's “most urgent health problem” has declined from 38% to 7% since Sexual Ecology was published, and support for gay rights is at an all-time high.

The debate over Sexual Ecology has continued in the years since it was published. It is discussed in over 200 subsequent books and hundreds of articles and scholarly papers on subjects including epidemiology, sociology, AIDS, gay history, psychology, spirituality, ecology, sexuality and many other topics. Much of the general discussion echoes the original debate, with some authors praising it as one of the key texts on gay men and AIDS and some condemning it as assimilationist, inaccurate or homophobic.

In 2004 The Publishing Triangle, an American association of LGBT publishing professionals, placed Sexual Ecology on its list of the “100 Best Gay and Lesbian Non Fiction Books” in history.

See also 
 And The Band Played On by Randy Shilts
 The Tipping Point: How Little Things Can Make a Big Difference by Malcolm Gladwell
 Plagues and Peoples by William McNeill
 The Trouble with Normal by Michael Warner

References

External links 
 Review in the New York Times

1990s LGBT literature
1997 non-fiction books
American non-fiction books
Books by Gabriel Rotello
Current affairs books
Dutton Penguin books
English-language books
History books about HIV/AIDS
LGBT literature in the United States
Non-fiction books about same-sex sexuality